Heshiabad (also Romanized as Heshīābād; also known as Heshābād) is a village in Garmeh-ye Jonubi Rural District, in the Central District of Meyaneh County, East Azerbaijan Province, Iran. At the 2006 census, its population was 183, in 31 families.

References 

Tageo

Populated places in Meyaneh County